Forest-Saint-Julien (Vivaro-Alpine: Forest Sant Julian) is a commune of the Hautes-Alpes department in Southeastern France.

Population

See also
Communes of the Hautes-Alpes department

References

Communes of Hautes-Alpes